The Apollo Music Hall, also known as the Red Cross Public House, was a building at 25 Hare Street, Bethnal Green. Built in 1854 at a cost of £3,000, it had a capacity of 600. It was licensed from 1854 until 1871.
 The music hall attracted young people that would "mimic popular comic songs, accompanied by a three-piece orchestra" during the week, and on Sundays the Salvation Army held church services that included gospel singing.

References

Theatres in the London Borough of Tower Hamlets